Star Awards 2001 is a television awards ceremony telecast on 25 November 2001 as part of the annual Star Awards organised by MediaCorp to honour its artistes who work on MediaCorp TV Channel 8. It is the first awards ceremony presented by the newly rebranded MediaCorp (formerly the TCS). The ceremony was hosted by Timothy Chao and Chinese actress Cheng Di.

Winners and nominees 
Winners are listed first, highlighted in boldface.

Special Awards

Popularity Awards

Malaysia polling

Ceremony 
Professional and Technical Awards were presented before the main ceremony via a clip montage due to time constraints. The main awards were presented during the ceremony.

Presenters

References

External links
Official homepage
Nominees

Star Awards